The 2013–14 season was the 68th season in HNK Rijeka’s history. It was their 23rd successive season in the Prva HNL, and 40th successive top tier season.

Competitions

Overall

Last updated: 17 May 2014.

Prva HNL

Classification

Results summary

Results by round

Results by opponent

Source: 2013–14 Prva HNL article

UEFA Europa League

Matches

Prva HNL

Source: HRnogomet.com

Croatian Cup

Source: HRnogomet.com

UEFA Europa League

Source: uefa.com

Friendlies

Pre-season

On-season

Mid-season

Player seasonal records
Competitive matches only. Updated to games played on 17 May 2014.

Goals

Source: Competitive matches

Assists

Source: Competitive matches

Clean sheets

Source: Competitive matches

Disciplinary record

Source: nk-rijeka.hr

Appearances and goals

Penalties

Overview of statistics

Transfers

In

Source: Glasilo Hrvatskog nogometnog saveza

Out

Source: Glasilo Hrvatskog nogometnog saveza

Spending:  €3,070,000
Income:  €1,520,000
Expenditure:  €1,550,000

Notes

References

2013-14
Croatian football clubs 2013–14 season
2013–14 UEFA Europa League participants seasons